is a 2012 Japanese film directed by Hiroaki Matsuyama.

Plot 

College graduate Shinomiya is delivered 100 million yen and an invitation to the restarted Liar Game. If she does not participate, she must return the money with an additional monetary penalty. She begs for help from her psychology professor, Akiyama (the last winner of the Liar Game) but he seems unsympathetic. Shinomiya is picked up by the organizers and transported to the location hosting the Liar Game. Former Liar Game player Fukunaga informs Akiyama of Shinomiya's plight while inviting him back to Liar Game. Akiyama thus returns to compete.

This edition of the Liar Game features a variant of musical chairs, starting with twenty players and fifteen chairs. Players (including eliminated ones) elect a representative after each round, who removes one of the numbered chairs from the game. Each player receives twenty tokens; each of the winning player's tokens is worth 100 million yen. Losing players must pay 200 million to the organizers. The players protest since they were only given 100 million with the invitation; they fear going into debt. The game is observed by Fukunaga and Tanimura.

The first round eliminates eight players. Shinomiya was tricked by Yasukawa but saved by Sakamaki; both of whom were former Liar Game players. Alliances are formed to win the elections and eliminate numbered chairs of other groups. Religious cult leader Harimoto has a team of five. Kiryu joins forces with Inuzuka and Sarukawa. Shinomiya groups with Akiyama, Sakamaki and Yasukawa, as well as eliminated players Emi and Akagi. The remaining six eliminated also form a group.

The groups of Harimoto and Kiryu work together to outnumber Akiyama's group. Yasukawa threatens to betray, so Akiyama has him eliminated; he joins Kiryu's group. Akiyama orders his group not to vote, resulting in Harimoto and Kiryu's groups turning on each other. Akiyama solicits the votes of the eliminated group, but they instead vote for Shinomiya, who Emi had urged to betray Akiyama. Shinomiya got their votes by offering her own tokens, later the other groups also do so to entice the eliminated group. Emi betrays Shinomiya; it is revealed that she is a spy for Harimoto.

With Sakamaki eliminated, Akiyama disposes of his tokens to assure other players that his team's remaining hope is Shinomiya. She gives her tokens to all players, altruistically urging them to help her win, then her tokens given to them can pay off their debts. The other players reject this plan. Kiryu taunts Shinomiya; she slaps him and is eliminated for using violence, seemingly ending the hopes of Akiyama's group.

Kiryu and Harimoto battle for the votes of the eliminated players' group with token bribes. Kiryu outmaneuvers and eliminates Harimoto by exposing that Harimoto intended his teammate Sakai to win, rendering Harimoto's given tokens useless.

The game comes down to Akiyama, Kiryu, Sakai, and Sarukawa. Sakai deceives Kiryu so that both are eliminated. Akiyama also eliminates himself, so Sarukawa is the winner. What had occurred was that Akiyama enticed Inuzuka to betray her group and hand over Sarukawa's tokens. Akiyama then bribed Inuzuka, Sakai and the eliminated players with Sarukawa's tokens - these players received the prize money instead of Sarukawa, who had none of his own tokens. Earlier, Shinomiya purposely eliminated herself so that other players would trust that Akiyama's team was genuinely aiming for a Sarukawa win.

All the players who received money decide to fully pay off their former allies' debts - thus no player profited or lost money. Fukunaga, Tanimura and the players celebrate the result. Akiyama denies that he entered the game to help Shinomiya, to which she responds that he is a poor liar.

Cast
 Shota Matsuda as Shinichi Akiyama
 Mikako Tabe as Yu Shinomiya
 Mari Hamada as 
 Jun Kaname as 
 Eiko Koike as 
  as 
  as 
  as 
  as 
  as 
  as 
 Hirofumi Arai as 
  as 
 Maho Nonami as 
  as 
  as 
 Ken Maeda as 
   as 
 Takurō Ōno as 
 Ryo Ryusei as 
 Mana Ashida as 
  as 
 Kosuke Suzuki as Fukunaga Yuji
 Kazuma Suzuki as 
 Makiko Esumi as

References

External links
 

2012 films
Films directed by Hiroaki Matsuyama
Japanese sequel films
Liar Game
Live-action films based on manga
Films about fraud